Purashcharana is a preliminary ritual action in Hinduism that is performed for the mastery of the mantra associated with a given deity. It is a rite that generally comprises the panchanga (five components) of japa (recitation of a mantra), tarpana (offerings for a deity's propitiation), abhisheka (consecration), homa (fire-oblation), and brahmabhukti (offerings made to Brahmins). It refers to all the religious practices performed by a practitioner prior to his acquisition of the shakti (power) of a mantra.

References 

Hindu rituals

Hindu practices